Hatem Missaoui (born 15 November 1970) is a Tunisian football manager.

References

1970 births
Living people
Tunisian football managers
LPS Tozeur managers
AS Gabès managers
ES Métlaoui managers
CS Hammam-Lif managers